A House: Live in Concert is the sixth album-length release from Irish rock band A House. It is a live album and was released after the band’s career had officially ended. Its liner notes include the names of all former members of A House, and the sign off, “Over and Out. Amen.”

Although issued in 1998, Live in Concert features recordings from earlier in the band’s career. The first seven tracks were recorded at Delacey House in Cork, Ireland on 18 October 1990, mostly featuring songs from the period of the I Want Too Much album. The show was part of Eurorock 90, an EBU event involving 10 different national radio stations nominating artists, and organised by RTE 2fm with BBC Radio 1. A House were invited to play by 2fm at short notice, as the original choice, Brian Kennedy, withdrew. A House had been dropped by their label after I Want Too Much. The Cork performance also includes “The Last to Know” which would be included on the Doodlebug EP, one of the first A House releases on Setanta Records, marking the resurrection of the band’s career. The song "Body Blow" is not elsewhere available in A House's recorded catalogue.

The final five tracks were recorded at the Riverside in Newcastle Upon Tyne on May 28, 1992. This is an acoustic set featuring songs from the period I Am the Greatest, A House’s first album with Setanta.

Track listing
  "I Want to Kill Something"
  "Talking for the Sake of Talking"
  "I Think I’m Going Mad"
  "I Want Too Much, Part 3"
  "The Last to Know"
  "Body Blow"
  "Violent Love"
  "You’re Too Young"
  "I Lied"
  "When I First Saw You"
  "Blind Faith"
  "Endless Art"
 "A House were David Couse, Fergal Bunbury, Martin Healy, Dermot Wylie, Susan Kavanagh, David Morrissey, Dave Dawson, Liam Crinion, Frank Buckley, Colin Boland, Over and Out     Amen"
Liam Crinion was the band's "long-time roadie, technician and all around top-man". Colin Boland was the band's recording engineer and sound man.*Frank Buckley was the A House driver and Tour Manager.
 Tracks 1–7 recorded at Delacey House, Cork, 18-10-90; produced by Jim Lockhart, engineered by Phil Cook.
 Tracks 8–12 (acoustic set) recorded at Riverside, Newcastle, 28-5-92; produced by Jeff Smith.

References

A House albums
1998 live albums
Live albums by Irish artists